Beales may refer to:

Beales (department store)

People with the surname
Edmond Beales, political activist
Peter Beales (1936–2013), English horticulturist and writer
Barclay Beales, singer
Edward Barclay Beales, Lord of the Manor, of Combe Martin

See also
Beals (disambiguation)
Beale (disambiguation)
Beatles (disambiguation)